Chichakluy-e Bash Qaleh (also Romanized as Chīchaklūy-e Bāsh Qal‘eh; also known as Chīchaklū-ye Baksh Qal‘eh and Chīchaklū-ye Bāsh Qal‘eh) is a village in Bash Qaleh Rural District, in the Central District of Urmia County, West Azerbaijan Province, Iran. At the 2006 census, its population was 438, in 118 families.

References 

Populated places in Urmia County